Azygiidae is a family of flatworms belonging to the order Plagiorchiida.

Genera:
 Azygia Looss, 1899
 Leuceruthrus Marshall & Gilbert, 1905
 Otodistomum Stafford, 1904
 Proterometra Horsfall, 1934

References

Platyhelminthes